The Škoda 32Tr SOR is a full-sized low-entry trolleybus produced in cooperation of Škoda Electric (subsidiary of Škoda Transportation) (electrical equipment and assembly) and SOR, which supplies the body based on the bus SOR NS 12.

Construction features 
The Škoda 32Tr is derived from the SOR NS 12 rigid bus. Electric motor is located in the rear of the bus. Plastic Ster seats are used inside. Rear axle is VOITH brand, the front axle is its own production with independent wheel suspension. Only rear axle is driven. Body of the vehicle is welded from steel-voltage profiles, flashings from the outside and interior are lined with plastic sheeting. On the right side of the bus, there are three passenger doors.

Production and operation 
Production started in 2018. In Czech and Slovak cities they replaced old high-floor trolleybuses Škoda 14Tr. Opava became the first to operate these trolleybuses.

References

Buses of the Czech Republic
Buses manufactured by SOR
Škoda vehicles
Single-deck buses
Full-size buses
Low-floor buses
Low-entry buses
Trolleybuses